Helge Rode (Frederiksberg, 16 October 1870 – 23 March 1937) was a Danish writer and critic, and journalist for Politiken, Berlingske Tidende, and Illustreret Tidende. He was a son of Margrethe Rode, the brother of politician Ove Rode, and father of actor Ebbe Rode. In 1905, he married the writer Edith Rode, with whom he had four children.

He was a critic of Georg Brandes and the Modern Breakthrough. Composer Carl Nielsen's piece Moderen (The Mother) was written for a play by Rode in 1920–1921.

References

External links
 

1870 births
1937 deaths
Danish male writers
Berlingske people
Politiken writers